Alexander Aksinin (2 October 1949 – 3 May 1985) was a Soviet printmaker and painter. His sophisticated etching technique, precision and perfectionist attention to details earned him the sobriquet the “Dürer of Lviv”. Art critics hailed him as “a 20th century Piranesi” for his dramatic and elaborate constructs.

Early life and education
Alexander Aksinin was born to military cartographer Dmitriy Aksinin and railroad official Ludmila Aksinina. In 1972 he graduated from the Ukrainian Institute of Printing, where he specialized in Graphics Arts.

Career
From 1972–1977, Aksinin worked as an art editor in a publishing house, served in the Soviet army and then worked as an art designer in an industrial design office. 

After 1977, he focused entirely on his art, in particular in the fields of printed and drawn graphics. Aksinin’s solo exhibitions were held in Tallinn, Estonia (1979, 1986), Lodz, Poland (1981, 1985), Warsaw (1984), Lvov (1987) and others. He also took part in various group exhibitions in the USSR and abroad.

Death
On 3 May 1985, on his way back from Tallinn, Alexander Aksinin died in a plane crash near Zolochiv, close to Lviv.

Art

A. Aksinin made 343 printed graphics including 3 unfinished works (mainly etching), about 200 unique drawn graphics in mixed techniques (gouache, India ink, color ink), as well as five oil paintings.

Exhibitions

Aksinin regularly participated in the International Biennale of Small Graphics Forms in Łódź (Poland), where he was awarded Honorable Medals in 1979 and 1985.
In 2015 his etching series "Boschiana" was included in the permanent exposition of the Jheronimus Bosch Art Center in 's-Hertogenbosch in the Netherlands.

 2017 Aksinin's Labyrinths. National Art Museum of Ukraine, Kyiv, Ukraine
 2014  Alexander Aksinin. Methagraphics: The Insight Experience. Lviv National Art Gallery, Lviv, Ukraine
 2013 Poetics of the Absurd, Gallery la Brique, Frankfurt, Germany
 2012  Metagraphics: Alexander Aksinin. Gallery Pionova, Gdansk, Poland
Aks-Art & Aks-Libris. Exlibris Gallery, Warsaw, Poland
 2010 Aksinin. Excessus. Gallery Vata, Rostov-on-Don, Russia 
Alexander Aksinin. National Center for Contemporary Art, Moscow, Russia
 2009 Alexander Aksinin: The Inner Experience. Art Gallery Primus, Lviv, Ukraine
 2008 Aksinin: Eternal Books - Visual Images. Exhibition Hall of Don State Public Library, Rostov-on-Don, Russia 
 2008 Time-Space-Eternity. The State Museum of A.Pushkin, Moscow, Russia
 2006 Alexander Aksinin. Day R. Museum of Contemporary Visual Art on Dmitrovskoy, Rostov-on-Don, Russia
 2001 Alexander Aksinin's Etchings. Gallery Dzyga, Lviv, Ukraine 
 1992 Central House of Artists, Moscow, Russia
 1991 Museum of Russian Art, Kiev, Ukraine
 1988 66 Etchings of Alexander Aksinin from private collections. Gallery of Graphics and Drawings, Gdynia, Poland; Muzeum Zamkowe, Malbork, Poland
 1987 Museum of Ukrainian Art, Lviv, Ukraine
 1985 Gallery In Blanco, Łódź, Poland
 1985 Art Saloon, Tallinn, Estonia
 1984 Gallery of Contemporary Soviet Art, Warsaw, Poland
 1981 January — Gallery  Bałucka, Łódź, Poland
 1979 Estonian State Art Institute, Tallinn, Estonia

References

External links
 Official site

1949 births
1985 deaths
Artists from Lviv
Modern printmakers
Ukrainian contemporary artists
Russian contemporary artists
Ukrainian printmakers
Russian printmakers
Ukrainian etchers
Russian etchers
Victims of aviation accidents or incidents in Ukraine
Victims of aviation accidents or incidents in the Soviet Union